Mini Babybel is a  brand of small snack cheese products that are individually packaged and available in various flavours. Half of the global production of Mini Babybel is made in Évron, a commune in the northwest of France. 

In the United States Le Groupe Bel produces the Mini Babybel cheeses in Kentucky.
In March 2016, Bel Brands USA opened a new plant in Brookings, South Dakota. At the time, Bel Brands projected that its 250 employees would produce 1.5 million Mini Babybel cheese wheels a day. In July 2018,  announced that the company had 12,700 employees in 30 subsidiaries around the world and that their first Canadian office would be in Quebec.

Product
Mini Babybel is known for its packaging, consisting of a netted bag in which each piece of cheese is encased in a blend of coloured paraffin and microcrystalline wax. Numerous flavors of Mini Babybel are offered across the world.

Flavours (with corresponding wrapping colours)

Products
 Babybel Maxi – Edam Only (FR)
 Babybel Tranches – Edam Only (FR, BE)

Mini Babybel 

 Mini Babybel (BE, CA, DE, ES, EE, FI, FR, GR, IE, IT, NL, PL, PT, UK, US, SK)
 Mini Babybel Mini Roulés/Enrollados/Mini Rolls – Edam only (FR, ES, IT)
 Mini Babybel Cheese & Crackers – Edam, Edam Light and White Cheddar (US, GR, PT)

Advertising
An advertising jingle associated with the product plays on the lyrics of the song "Barbara Ann" by The Regents. Use of said jingle started in France in the end of the 1970s, and then emerged to other parts of Europe and French-Canada by the start of the 1990s. They tout the product as an "always on the go and ready for anything" snack cheese.

The advertising for Babybel in the UK in the late 1990s and early 2000s had the slogan "Too tasty to share". 

As of 2012, a recording of the song "Get in Line" by I'm from Barcelona has been used in their  adverts, where the band rerecorded the song with a children's choir. In August 2012, there was controversy over its promotional use of the French slogan "Des vacances de malade mental" ("having a mental holiday", or literally "holidaying like a mentally ill person") which was deemed offensive to people with learning difficulties or mental illnesses.

References

External links

 Babybel websites: France, United Kingdom, Netherlands, Canada, United States
 Groupe Bel official website

French cheeses
Cow's-milk cheeses
Products introduced in 1952
Brand name dairy products